Los Angeles Is Not For Sale, Vol. 1 is the fourth studio album by Los Angeles rapper Dom Kennedy, released December 23, 2016 via his label, The Other People's Money Company. It is the first release of a planned two-piece project. The album features guest appearances from Ricky Hil, Niko G4, Troy Noka, Glasses Malone and P-Lo while its production was handled by Aaron Reid, J.Lbs, Polyester, Jake One, Cardo, Mike Free, and Drewbyrd.

The album received negative reviews and is considered one of Kennedy's weaker efforts. Despite the negative response, its companion album, Los Angeles Is Not For Sale, Vol. 2, is scheduled for release in 2018.

Critical reception

Los Angeles Is Not For Sale, Vol. 1 has received negative reviews from music critics and was overlooked by mainstream media publications. Jesse Fairfax of HipHopDX wrote, "Still stumbling over himself trying to find inspiration and failing to reclaim his magic, Los Angeles Is Not For Sale extends Dom Kennedy’s artistic downward spiral for another year". In a review from TheFreshCommittee, Kennedy's lackluster rhymes and offbeat ramblings were criticized.

Commercial performance
Unlike its predecessor, the album failed to chart in the Billboard 200 and accurate sales information are unavailable.

Track listing

References

2016 albums
Dom Kennedy albums
Albums produced by Cardo
Albums produced by Jake One
Albums produced by Mike Free